Walter B. Huber (June 29, 1903 – August 8, 1982) was an American lawyer and politician who served three terms as a U.S. Representative from Ohio from 1945 to 1951.

Biography 
Born in Akron, Ohio, Huber associated with the Summit County prosecuting attorney 1936-1944.

Congress 
Huber was elected as a Democrat to the Seventy-ninth, Eightieth, and Eighty-first Congresses (January 3, 1945 – January 3, 1951).
He was an unsuccessful candidate for reelection in 1950 to the Eighty-second Congress and for election in 1952 to the Eighty-third Congress.

Later career and death 
Investigator for the United States Senate Committee on the Judiciary, Subcommittee on Patents, Trademarks, and Copyrights, from October 20, 1955, to April 30, 1958.
Administrative assistant with House Subcommittee on Legislative Oversight from May 1, 1958, to January 3, 1959.
Consultant with House Un-American Activities Committee from 1959 to 1968.
Consultant with an environmental protection association.
Resided in Nanjemoy, Maryland until his death in Lexington Park, Maryland, on August 8, 1982.
He was interred at Christ Church, Ironsides, Maryland.

Sources

1903 births
1982 deaths
Politicians from Akron, Ohio
Democratic Party members of the United States House of Representatives from Ohio
20th-century American politicians